Graffiti abatement is a joint effort between a given community; its public works division; police department; community development; and parks, recreation, and community services to eliminate graffiti vandalism. In an effective graffiti abatement program, hot spots – areas frequently targeted by graffiti vandals – are checked regularly, with the overall goal of removing graffiti as soon as possible. The reasoning given is, that graffiti is an expensive burden for a community, as it lowers property values, generates repair costs and can incite additional criminal activity.

Young Offender Graffiti Abatement Programs 
Young offender graffiti abatement programs have been growing in popularity throughout Europe and Australia as an effective method to reduce local government costs while allowing young offenders to perform community service under supervision of welfare officers. Safe graffiti removal programs are developed in conjunction with government and graffiti remover chemical manufacturers.

Graffiti Offender Mentorship. 
A new and effective approach to the problem of graffiti is graffiti offender mentorship programs as developed by "The Big Picture Arts Project".

If graffiti is to be treated with empathy, then solutions must be aimed at redirection and culture shift. By mentoring young artists in their creative growth process the change is more significant.
  
Professional artists work with small groups of youth on a project lasting about a week, teaching them how to stretch and gesso their own canvas, meet other working artists,  visit galleries and museums to establish a vision of their own waiting place in the future of art. Redirecting them towards making  “ART WITHOUT VICTIMS”.

See also
 Anti-graffiti coating
 Broken windows theory
 Philadelphia Anti-Graffiti Network

References

Government Abatement Program

External links
 http://bigpicturearts.com
 Big Picture Arts Project (Artists working to redirect graffiti offenders towards making art without victims]
 RAGE - Residents Against Graffiti Everywhere
 No Graffiti Network
 Graffiti Abatement Tools and Techniques
 2002 New York City Council Investigation Division Graffiti Report

Graffiti and unauthorised signage